Kontrafakt is a Slovak hip-hop rap group which was formed by Rytmus, Ego and Martin Rády with DJ Anys in Slovakia, Piešťany in 2001.

History 
Rytmus became a well-known figure in the Slovak hip-hop scene of the second half of the 1990s. He originally performed under the nickname "Pa3k Metamorfolord", which was invented by Kofik ze Senca, under which he appears in the compilation Zvuk Ulice (Sound of The Streets).

In 2001, Rytmus met Ego and Anys, who have collaborated with each other before, for example in the band Prízrak in the 90's. Rytmus thus became the founder of the hip-hop trio Kontrafakt, but at first the group performed under the name Déjavu. After performances at hip-hop festivals, the group accepted an offer to record and in the summer of 2003 the publishing house of the Czech hip-hop magazine BbaRáK released their first single Dáva mi/Dobré veci/Moja rola. The single, Dáva mi, had a video clip that was shot by a former Prague graffiti writer, now a director, Romeo. The music video topped many charts in Slovakia and Czech Republic. The video even appeared on MTV.

In 2003, they released their first mixtape, Tri špinavé mená (Three dirty names). In 2004, they released their debut album, E.R.A.. The album received a very positive feedback from the Slovak hip-hop community and hip-hop started rapidly growing. E.R.A. is certified platinum. In 2005, they went on their first tour and the first hip-hop tour in Slovakia, MURDARDO MULANO TOUR. It is considered to be a groundbreaking thing in Slovak hip-hop, since it was the first hip-hop tour, clubs were sold out, there was a unique connection between rappers and professional singers from Slovakia, it had the best sound and light equipment and a live band. They performed in various bigger cities.

In 2007, they released their 2nd studio album, Bozk na rozlúčku (Goodbye Kiss). On the album, Nate Dogg appeared on one track. In 2013 their 3th studio album, Navždy (Forever) was released, which contains a song produced by DJ Premier named O5 S5. Navždy (Forever) is certified platinum in Slovakia and Czech Republic. In May 2014, they went on their second tour, NAVŽDY TOUR. They visited 7 Slovak cities.

In 2019, they released their 4th studio album, Real Newz, which had some new names on it such as Dalyb, Samey, Zayo, Dokkeytino, Viktor Sheen, Calin and others. The album is considered new school.

In 2020, Kontrafakt's music video "Ideme dnu (We Go In)" was nominated for Best Cinematography at the Berlin Music Video Awards. The cinematographer behind this music video is Radim Strelka.

In 2021, 20 years after the group formation, they released their 5th studio album, KF ako Rolls (KF like Rolls), to celebrate the anniversary. Before the album was released, they released a preview of every song on YouTube. Two days later, a documentary film, The Most Legendary, was also released on their YouTube channel. The documentary explained the timeline of the group as a whole.

Kontrafakt frequently appears at Hip Hop Kemp and other hip-hop festivals.

Kontrafakt is the best-selling hip-hop group in Slovakia. Every Kontrafakt album is certified platinum.

Members
The group's members are Rytmus, Ego and DJ Anys.

Discography

Mixtapes 

 Tri špinavé mená (2003)

Studio albums

 E.R.A. (2004)
 Bozk na rozlúčku (2007)
 Navždy (2013)
 Real Newz (2019)

 KF ako Rolls (2021)

Singles 

 Dáva mi (2003)
 I tak to osiągnę (WWO ft. Orion, Włodi, Kontrafakt & Soundkail) (2006)
 Stokujeme Vonku (2013)

Music videos 

 2003 – Dáva mi
 2004 – E.R.A.
 2005 – Pravda bolí/Mulano stylos
 2005 – Nelutujem
 2006 – Moji ľudia
 2006 – I tak to osiągnę (WWO ft. Orion, Włodi, Kontrafakt & Soundkail)
 2006 – Potrebujem tvoju nenávisť
 2007 – Život je boj
 2009 – Bozk na rozlúčku
 2013 – Stokujeme Vonku
 2013 – Odviati Vetrom
 2013 – JBMNT
 2013 – V mojom svete
 2014 – Kým neskapem
 2014 – Keď Jazdíme My
 2014 – Podzemie
 2014 – SSMD
 2015 – Život je film
 2019 – Ideme dnu
 2019 – Neviditelnej (ft. Viktor Sheen, Calin)
 2019 – Jlo (ft. Mirez x Dalyb x Zayo x Dokkeytino x Porsche Boy)
 2019 – Si Sa Namotal
 2020 – Pocity (ft. Sima)
 2020 – Instagram
 2020 – Mesiac

 2021 – Reklama na Rap

 2021 – Iní

DVD 

 MURDARDO MULANO TOUR 2005 (DVD)

Tours 

 MURDARDO MULANO TOUR
 NAVŽDY TOUR

References 

Slovak musical groups